Dorris is a surname. Notable people with the surname include: 

Andy Dorris (born 1951), American football player
Anita Dorris (1903–1993), German actress of the Silent era
Danielle Dorris (born 2002), Canadian Paralympic swimmer
Derek Dorris (born 1978), American football player
George Dorris (born 1930), American dance historian, educator, editor, and writer
Michael Dorris (1945–1997), American author